Marko Osmakcic (born 10 August 1998) is a retired Swiss tennis player. Marko has a career high junior ranking of 41. He made the third round of the 2015 Australian Open boys singles. In 2015 Osmakcic was invited to the Switzerland Davis Cup team. In 2020, he participated in the Swiss version of The Bachelorette, where he finished in third place. Later, he also participated in Serbian reality show Zadruga 5,  which he left self willingly after 9 months, before it finished.

External links

References 

1998 births
Living people
Swiss male tennis players